Castle Rocks State Park is a public recreation area encompassing  in Cassia County, Idaho, United States. The state park is located in Big Cove at the base of Cache Peak in the Albion Mountains.

History
In 2000, the Castle Rock Ranch Acquisition Act was passed, and money from the Conservation and Access funds were used to purchase the private ranch at Castle Rocks. Following the purchase by the National Park Service, the lands were transferred to the state of Idaho:

Wildlife
This state park is home to birds and mammals which are moose, cougar, coyote, mule deer, sage grouse, pinyon jay and Virginia's warbler.

See also

 List of Idaho state parks
 National Parks in Idaho

References

External links

Castle Rocks State Park Idaho Parks and Recreation
Castle Rocks State Park Location Map Idaho Parks and Recreation
Castle Rocks State Park Trails Map Idaho Parks and Recreation

State parks of Idaho
Protected areas established in 2003
Protected areas of Cassia County, Idaho
2003 establishments in Idaho